City of Gold or Cities of Gold may refer to:

Places

Mythological and legendary 
Seven Cities of Gold
Quivira, one of the mythical seven Cities of Gold
El Dorado, mythical city of gold in South America
City of the Caesars, mythical South American city of great wealth
La Canela, legendary location in South America said to contain large amounts of gold and spices
Paititi, legendary Inca lost city of gold, silver and jewels said to lie east of the Andes in the rain forest
Lanka, the capital city of Ravana in the epic Ramayana

Books 
City of Gold (book), a collection of Old Testament stories retold for children by Peter Dickinson
City of Gold (Deighton), a spy thriller by Len Deighton
City of Gold: A biography of Bombay by  Gillian Tindall
Cities of Gold: A Journey Across the American Southwest in Pursuit of Coronado by Douglas Preston
The City of Gold and Lead, a novel in the Tripods series by John Christopher

Film and television
The Mysterious Cities of Gold, Japanese-French animated series
City of Gold (2015 film), a documentary film about Los Angeles Times food critic Jonathan Gold
City of Gold (2010 film), a Hindi film
City of Gold (1957 film), a film about the town of Dawson City, Yukon

Music
City of Gold (Pearls Before Swine album) (1971)
City of Gold (Fady Maalouf album) (2012)
Cities of Gold (album), a 2009 album by Lost Valentinos
"City of Gold", a song by DragonForce from Maximum Overload 
"City of Gold", a song by HṚṢṬA from L'éclat du ciel était insoutenable
"City of Gold", a composition by Tony Banks (musician)
"City of Gold", a song by K-391 & Diviners (ft. Anna Yvette)

See also
Golden City (disambiguation)
Seven Cities of Gold (disambiguation)
Lost city (disambiguation)
Gold Museum, Bogotá